The 2012 Vattenfall Cyclassics was the 17th running of the Vattenfall Cyclassics single-day cycling race.

In a mass sprint finish, the race was won by  rider Arnaud Démare, who became the first French rider to take victory in the event. Démare finished ahead of 's André Greipel, and 's Giacomo Nizzolo, who completed the podium.

Teams
As the Vattenfall Cyclassics was a UCI World Tour event, all 18 UCI ProTeams were invited automatically and obligated to send a squad. Two other squads –  and  – were given wildcard places into the race, and as such, formed the event's 20-team peloton.

The 20 teams that competed in the race were:

Results

References

External links

Vattenfall Cyclassics
Vattenfall Cyclassics
2012